Mike Gentile (born May 24, 1974) is a former U.S. soccer midfielder who, while drafted twice by teams in Major League Soccer, spent his seven season career in the second division USISL. He was a member of the United States U-20 men's national soccer team at the 1993 FIFA World Youth Championship.

Early years
Gentile attended Livonia Churchill High School along with Scott Lamphear and Jeff Cassar where they were finalist in the Class A State Championship in 1990 as a Junior.

College
Gentile attended college at the University of Wisconsin–Madison where he played on the soccer team from 1992 to 1995. In 1995, the Badgers won the NCAA Men's Soccer Championship while Gentile was selected a third team All-American. In 1993, he was part of the United States U-20 men's national soccer team at the 1993 FIFA World Youth Championship, but he never entered a game in the tournament. In 2015, Gentile was added to the UW Athletic Hall of Fame.

Professional
In March 1996, the Colorado Rapids selected Gentile in the first round (9th overall) of the 1996 College Draft. The Rapids released Gentile during the preseason and he signed with the Milwaukee Rampage of the USISL.

In 1997, the Rampage won the league championship. On July 13, 1999, the Rampage unexpectedly released Gentile along with four other players. Gentile had started five games before being benched in June. He immediately signed with the Minnesota Thunder, going on to win the 1999 league championship with his new team.

In February 2000, Gentile was again drafted by an MLS team when the Tampa Bay Mutiny selected him in the sixth round (66th overall) in the 2000 MLS SuperDraft. However, on February 22, 2000, the Mutiny released Gentile and he returned to the Thunder. In 2001, he signed a one-year contract, with a one-year option. He played through at least the 2002 season.

References

External links
 University of Wisconsin–Madison Media Guide
 University of Wisconsin Men's Soccer Hall of Fame

1974 births
Living people
American soccer players
A-League (1995–2004) players
Milwaukee Rampage players
Minnesota Thunder players
Wisconsin Badgers men's soccer players
Colorado Rapids draft picks
Tampa Bay Mutiny draft picks
United States men's under-20 international soccer players
Association football midfielders
NCAA Division I Men's Soccer Tournament Most Outstanding Player winners